John Luk Jok (died 2 June 2020) was a South Sudanese politician.

He was educated at the University of Khartoum from 1974 to 1977, where he earned a law degree. He later graduated from the London School of Economics in 1983.

Jok served as Minister of Justice from 10 July 2011 until 12 March 2020, when he was appointed Minister of East African Affairs in the Cabinet of South Sudan. 

Jok died in his home at Juba on 2 June 2020, aged 68 from COVID-19.

See also
 SPLM
 SPLA

References

2020 deaths
Government ministers of South Sudan
Year of birth missing
1950s births
Deaths from the COVID-19 pandemic in South Sudan